Garima Ajmani, now called Shagun Ajmani, is an Indian television actress and model. She made her television debut on Sahara One's show  Zaara (TV series) where she played the role of Shirin. She is best known for playing Shabnam, a negative role on the hit series Jamai Raja (2014 TV series)   which was her latest venture.

Television

References

Living people
Indian soap opera actresses
Actresses in Hindi television
1991 births